Girls on Film is the second novel in the A-List series by Zoey Dean.  It was published in April 2004 through the Poppy imprint at Little, Brown Books for Young Readers.

Plot summary
After rejecting Ben, Anna tries to focus on her studies at Beverly Hills High. She and Sam partner up on an English project to create a short film based on The Great Gatsby. They agree to film their project at V's, an exclusive spa and resort in the Ojai desert. Anna writes the screenplay, which impresses Sam and she begins to develop a crush on Anna, much to her confusion. At school, Adam asks Anna out on a date and she agrees, in hopes of getting over Ben, who continues to send grand romantic gestures.

Anna's older sister Susan arrives in Los Angeles and takes up residence at the Beverly Hills Hotel. Anna is concerned, especially since Susan claims to have checked out of rehab early but Susan brushes off her concerns. Susan meets Cammie, Dee, and Sam at the hotel and they all agree to join Sam and Anna at V's for the weekend.

Anna meets with her father's girlfriend, Margaret Cunningham, at her new entertainment agency that she co-founded with Clark Sheppard, Cammie's father. Anna accepts an after-school internship with Margaret and her first assignment is to escort a screenwriter to an upcoming industry party. When Margaret learns that Susan knows the screenwriter, she encourages Anna to bring Susan to the party as well.

Ben runs into Anna and Adam while they are on a date and he pretends his visiting cousin is also his date, which backfires. His cousin encourages Ben to go after Anna. Separately, Anna tells Sam and Susan that she only sees Adam as a friend and can't stop thinking about Ben. They encourage Anna to call Ben from the spa, which she does, but she immediately regrets it. Unbeknownst to Anna, Cammie also calls Ben and invites him to the spa but she is annoyed that he is only interested in seeing Anna.

At V's, Ben arrives and interrupts their filming. The group find themselves locked in a sauna and Susan encourages the group to admit their secrets to each other, namely that Dee is pregnant with Ben's baby. Sam reveals that Dee asked to borrow a tampon, proving the claim false. Anna calls the group out for being cruel to each other and she calls out Ben for being unable to be honest with her over the real reason he abandoned her on the boat.

Back in Los Angeles, Cammie convinces Susan to break her sobriety and she shows up drunk at the industry party, embarrassing herself and Anna. Sam, who had been filming the party, pretends that Susan's outburst is all part of the short film and helps Anna take Susan home. At Anna's house, Sam realizes she confused her crush with admiration of Anna and she encourages Anna to go on a getaway to clear her head from her family troubles. She secretly informs Ben where to find Anna.

Jonathan arrives and he and Susan have a big confrontation over her addiction. She admits that she was kicked out of rehab and she is angry with their father for successfully bribing an ex-boyfriend to stay away from her. Anna tells Sam and Jonathan to work out their problems instead of putting her in the middle. She heads to Santa Barbara where she runs into Ben. He admits the real reason he left her on the boat: his father is a compulsive gambler and threatened to kill himself after he got into heavy debt and Ben was embarrassed to admit his dysfunctional family to her. Anna forgives him and the two finally have sex.

Reviews 
Girls on Film received mostly positive reviews. Of it, Kirkus wrote, "this guilty pleasure of a read again offers girls the fun of peeking through a chink in the gated walls of the rich, the beautiful, and the mean."School Library Journal criticized the plot, saying, "Though the issues and scenes are current, the book reads like fantasy as this much intrigue would wear out even the most devious, superficial girl-on-the-go" but noted that it was "[i]rresistible mind candy that teens will devour."

References

American young adult novels
2004 American novels